The Tschenglser Hochwand is a mountain in the Ortler Alps in South Tyrol, Italy.

References 
 Peter Holl: Alpenvereinsführer Ortleralpen, 9. Auflage, München 2003, 
 Zeitschrift des Deutschen und Oesterreichischen Alpenvereins, Band II, Berlin, München, Wien 1871 
 Eduard Richter: Die Erschließung der Ostalpen, II. Band, Verlag des Deutschen und Oesterreichischen Alpenvereins, Berlin, 1894
 Casa Editrice Tabacco, Udine: Carta topografica 1:25.000, Blatt 08, Ortles-Cevedale/Ortlergebiet

External links 

Mountains of the Alps
Mountains of South Tyrol
Alpine three-thousanders
Ortler Alps